Nirimba is a rural locality in the Shire of Murray in the Peel Region of Western Australia, located directly south of the Austin Cove development in South Yunderup.

Very lowly populated, agricultural activities such as dairying and horse breeding are predominant in the area, although it is likely to be superseded by an increase in real estate development due to Nirimba now being directly accessible from the Forrest Highway, of which it is halfway between the cities of Perth and Bunbury.

Shire of Murray